The Ahafo Region is a newly created region in Ghana with Goaso as its capital. The region has administrative and governmental legislature like all the ten already existing regions in Ghana. The region was carved out of the south-eastern part of the Brong Ahafo Region and was in fulfillment of a campaign promise made by New Patriotic Party. Prior to the 2016 Ghanaian general election, the then candidate Nana Akufo-Addo declared that when elected, he would explore the possibility of creating new regions out of some of the existing regions in Ghana in order to bring government closer to citizens.

The execution of plans for the creation of the regions was assigned to the newly created Ministry of Regional Reorganization and Development which is under the leadership of Hon. Dan Botwe. Government of Ghana ministry charged with the responsibility of supervising the creation of new regions in Ghana. In March 2017, the ministry sent the blue print for the creation of the region along with others to the Council of State. The council met over 36 times from the time of submission to August 2017. The final stage for the creation of the region was decided through a referendum by the people within the catchment of the new region on 27 December 2018.

Major Towns

Administrative divisions
The political administration of the region is through the local government system. Under this administration system, the region is divided into six MMDA's (made up of 0 Metropolitan, 3 Municipal and 3 Ordinary Assemblies). Each District, Municipal or Metropolitan Assembly, is administered by a Chief Executive, representing the central government but deriving authority from an Assembly headed by a presiding member elected from among the members themselves. The current list is as follows:

History 
A referendum on 27 December 2018 approved the creation of Ahafo Region. Out of a total of 307,108 registered votes, 277.663 took part in the referendum with 276,763 (99.68 per cent) voting in favour of the creation of the new region. 675 (0.24 per cent) rejected the motion and 225 rejected ballots representing 0.08% of total votes cast .
The region was created on the 13th of February 2019 by Constitutional Instrument 114 . Goaso was announced as the capital of the new region.

Economy
Ahafo is endowed  with rich natural resources such as Gold, Diamonds, Timber etc.
Gold deposit abounds in large quantities in the Mim, Ahafo, Kenyasi and Yamfo Areas.
Newmont Gold Ghana Limited which is one of the biggest mining companies in the world, currently have their mining operations in the Kenyasi and Yamfo Areas.

Ahafo being one of the forest belts in Ghana, has a lot of  forest reserves.
Timber industry is the second highest employer in the Region.
There are large and medium timber companies scattered across the Region.
Notable among the timber companies in the region are  Ayum Forest Products Co. Ltd,  Exbo wood Co. Ltd,   Ocean-wood Co. Ltd,      Supremo-wood processing Co LTD, all in Mim, Ahafo.

Ahafo Region is known to be the bread basket of Ghana.
The soil type in the region supports the production of both food and cash crops.
The region is known for its large cocoa and cashew productions.
The major agro-processing company in the region is the   Mim Cashew & Agric Products company LTD located at  Mim, Ahafo.

The Region needs more of the agro-processing companies to leverage on its Agricultural produce.

Tourism
Tourist Attractions in the Ahafo Region are:
 Mim Bour at Mim, Ahafo
 Mim Lake also in Mim, Ahafo
 The White-necked Rockfowl conservation at Asumura
 Okomfo Anokye tree at Sankore

Geography and climate

Location and size 
The Ahafo Region is bordered on the north by the Bono region, the east by Ashanti Region, the west by the Bono region, the south by the Western North Region and is made up of 6 districts.

Climate and vegetation 
The Ahafo Region is part of the forest belt of Ghana and has a vegetation consists predominantly of fertile soil, grassland, especially savanna with clusters of drought-resistant trees such as baobabs or acacias. Between December and April is the dry season. The wet season is between about July and November with an average annual rainfall of 750 to 1050 mm (30 to 40 inches). The highest temperatures are reached at the end of the dry season, the lowest in December and January. However, the hot Harmattan wind from the Sahara blows frequently between December and the beginning of February. The temperatures can vary between 14 °C (59 °F) at night and 40 °C (104 °F) during the day.

References 

 
Regions of Ghana
2019 in Ghana
States and territories established in 2019